Luiz Otávio Santos de Araújo (born 12 October 1990), commonly known as Tinga, is a Brazilian footballer who plays as a midfielder for Botafogo-PB.

Career
A product of Ponte Preta's youth team, Tinga became a first team regular player in early 2009 at 18 years old. He made good appearances for Ponte Preta in the Série B and attracted the interest of some big Brazilian clubs.

Tinga transferred to Palmeiras after the end of the 2010 FIFA World Cup, and since then became a first choice substitute. His first match for Palmeiras came against Santos, where Tinga scored in the second half to give Palmeiras a 2-1 win in the Série A.

On December 19, 2012, Palmeiras confirmed that loaned Tinga for Figueirense until December 2013.

Club statistics
As of 15 August 2010

Honours
Ponte Preta
 Interior Paulista Championship: 2009

Brazil U-20
 Hexagonal International Tournament in Venezuela: 2009

References

External links
 

 Profile at Globoesporte's Futpedia
 Tinga at ZeroZero

Living people
1990 births
Brazilian footballers
Campeonato Brasileiro Série A players
Campeonato Brasileiro Série B players
Campeonato Brasileiro Série C players
J2 League players
Qatar Stars League players
Associação Atlética Ponte Preta players
Sociedade Esportiva Palmeiras players
Ceará Sporting Club players
Figueirense FC players
Avaí FC players
Júbilo Iwata players
Clube de Regatas Brasil players
Umm Salal SC players
Joinville Esporte Clube players
Esporte Clube Santo André players
Vila Nova Futebol Clube players
Santa Cruz Futebol Clube players
Brazilian expatriate footballers
Brazilian expatriate sportspeople in Japan
Expatriate footballers in Japan
Expatriate footballers in Thailand
Brazilian expatriate sportspeople in Qatar
Expatriate footballers in Qatar
Association football midfielders
People from Bom Jardim